Büyükgelengeç is a village in the Çayırlı District, Erzincan Province, Turkey. The village is populated by Kurds of the Rutan tribe and had a population of 50 in 2021. The hamlet of Karagöz is attached to the village.

References 

Villages in Çayırlı District
Kurdish settlements in Erzincan Province